Oração aos moços is a famous speech written by the Brazilian writer Ruy Barbosa in 1920. Barbosa, a famous lawyer, journalist and politician, presents his thoughts on the role of magistrates and lawyers and gives a retrospective on his own life as an example for upcoming generations.

It was published as a book in 1921.

References

Bibliography

1921 non-fiction books
Brazilian books
1920 speeches
Brazilian non-fiction books